Moskvitch may refer to:

 A person from Moscow (from Ruissian Москвич)
 Moskvitch, a Soviet automobile brand produced by the AZLK (former MZMA) plant
 Moskvitch (Bulgaria), Bulgarian-made motor cars based on Soviet Moskvitches, built at the "Balkan" factory
 Moskvitch (ship), a series of Soviet short-range passenger river ships
 Moskvitch (radio receiver), a very popular Soviet broadcast receivers produced by various plants since 1947 till late 1950s (more than 2 mil issued)